Brier Hill is an unincorporated community in Redstone Township, Fayette County, Pennsylvania, United States. Brier Hill has a post office, with ZIP code 15415.

References

Unincorporated communities in Fayette County, Pennsylvania
Unincorporated communities in Pennsylvania